Enzo Miguel Larrosa Martínez (born 21 April 2001) is a Uruguayan professional footballer who plays as a forward for Argentine Primera División club Godoy Cruz.

Career
Larrosa is a youth academy graduate of Boston River. He made his professional debut for the club on 11 November 2020 in a goalless draw against Danubio.

Larrosa is a Uruguayan youth international. He is currently a member of Uruguay under-20 team.

Career statistics

Club

References

External links
 

2001 births
Living people
Uruguayan footballers
Uruguayan expatriate footballers
People from Canelones Department
Association football forwards
Uruguayan Primera División players
Argentine Primera División players
Boston River players
Godoy Cruz Antonio Tomba footballers
Uruguayan expatriate sportspeople in Argentina
Expatriate footballers in Argentina